The Irish Times is an Irish daily broadsheet newspaper and online digital publication. It launched on 29 March 1859. The editor is Ruadhán Mac Cormaic. It is published every day except Sundays. The Irish Times is considered a newspaper of record for Ireland.

Though formed as a Protestant nationalist paper, within two decades and under new owners it had become the voice of British unionism in Ireland. It is no longer a pro unionist paper; it presents itself politically as "liberal and progressive", as well as being centre-right on economic issues. The editorship of the newspaper from 1859 until 1986 was controlled by the Anglo-Irish Protestant minority, only gaining its first nominal Irish Catholic editor 127 years into its existence.

The paper's most prominent columnists include writer and arts commentator Fintan O'Toole and satirist Miriam Lord. The late Taoiseach Garret FitzGerald was once a columnist. Senior international figures, including Tony Blair and Bill Clinton, have written for its op-ed page. Its most prominent columns have included the political column Backbencher, by John Healy, Drapier (an anonymous piece produced weekly by a politician, giving the 'insider' view of politics), Rite and Reason (a weekly religious column, edited by Patsy McGarry, the religious affairs editor) and the long-running An Irishman's Diary. An Irishman's Diary was written by Patrick Campbell in the forties (under the pseudonym "Quidnunc"); by Seamus Kelly from 1949 to 1979 (also writing as  "Quidnunc"); and more recently by Kevin Myers. After Myers' move to the rival Irish Independent, An Irishman's Diary has usually been the work of Frank McNally. On the sports pages, Philip Reid is the paper's golf correspondent.

One of its most popular columns was the biting and humorous Cruiskeen Lawn satire column written, originally in Irish, later in English, by Myles na gCopaleen, the pen name of Brian O'Nolan (Brian Ó Nualláin) who also wrote books using the name Flann O'Brien. Cruiskeen Lawn is an anglicised spelling of the Irish words crúiscín lán, meaning 'little full jug'. Cruiskeen Lawn made its debut in October 1940, and appeared with varying regularity until O'Nolan's death in 1966.

History

Origins
The first appearance of a newspaper using the name The Irish Times occurred in 1823, but this closed in 1825. The title was revived—initially as a thrice-weekly publication but soon becoming a daily—by a 22-year-old army officer, Lawrence E. Knox (later known as Major Lawrence Knox), with the first edition being published on 29 March 1859. It was founded as a moderate Protestant newspaper, reflecting the politics of Knox, who envisaged it as a "new conservative daily newspaper". Its headquarters were at 4 Lower Abbey Street in Dublin. Its main competitor in its early days was the Dublin Daily Express.

The Arnotts
After Knox's death in 1873, the paper was sold to the widow of Sir John Arnott, a Member of Parliament (MP), a former Lord Mayor of Cork and owner of Arnotts, one of Dublin's major Department stores. The sale, for £35,000, led to two major changes. Its headquarters was shifted to 31 Westmoreland Street, remaining in buildings on or near that site until 2005. Its politics also shifted dramatically, becoming predominantly Unionist in outlook, and it was closely associated with the Irish Unionist Alliance. The paper, along with the Irish Independent and various regional papers, called for the execution of the leaders of the failed 1916 Easter Rising.

Though the paper became a publicly listed company in 1900, the family continued to hold a majority shareholding until the 1960s (even after the family lost control, the great-grandson of the original purchaser was the paper's London editor). The last member of the Arnott family to sit on the paper's board was Sir Lauriston Arnott, who died in 1958.

The editor during the 1930s, R. M. Smyllie, had strong anti-fascist views, and angered the Irish Catholic hierarchy by opposing General Franco during the Spanish Civil War. During World War II, The Irish Times, like other national newspapers, had problems with Irish Government censorship. The Times was largely pro-Allies and was opposed to the Éamon de Valera government policy of neutrality.

The Irish Times Trust
In 1974, ownership was transferred to a non-charitable trust, The Irish Times Trust. However several years later the articles of the Trust were adjusted, giving Major McDowell 10 preference shares and one more vote than the combined votes of all the other directors should any move be made to remove him. Major McDowell died in 2009.
The Trust was set up in 1974 as "a company limited by guarantee" to purchase The Irish Times Limited and to ensure that The Irish Times would be published as an independent newspaper with specific editorial objectives. (See below).

The Trust is regulated by a legal document, the Memorandum and Articles of Association, and controlled by a body of people (the Governors) under company law. It is not a charity and does not have charitable status. It has no beneficial shareholders and it cannot pay dividends. Any profits made by The Irish Times cannot be distributed to the Trust but must be used to strengthen the newspaper, directly or indirectly.

The Trust is composed of a maximum of 11 Governors. The Trust appoints Governors who are required to be "representative broadly of the community throughout the whole of Ireland".

As of June 2012, Ruth Barrington is the chair of the trust, and the governors are Tom Arnold, David Begg, Noel Dorr, Margaret Elliott, Rosemary Kelly, Eoin O'Driscoll, Fergus O'Ferrall, Judith Woodworth, Barry Smyth, and Caitriona Murphy.

In 2015, The Irish Times Trust Limited joined as a member organization of the European Press Prize.

Recent history
In 1969, the longest-serving editor of The Irish Times, Douglas Gageby, was allegedly called a "white nigger" by company chairman Thomas Bleakley McDowell, because of the newspaper's coverage of Northern Ireland at the outset of the Troubles, which was supportive of Irish nationalism.

The paper established its first bureau in Asia when foreign correspondent Conor O'Clery moved to Beijing in 1996.

The paper suffered considerable financial difficulty in 2002 when a drop in advertising revenue coincided with a decision by the company to invest its reserves in the building of a new printing plant. None of the journalists were laid off, but many took a voluntary redundancy package when the paper was greatly restructured. Some foreign bureaux were closed and it also stopped publishing "colour" pages devoted to Irish regions, with regional coverage now merged with news. The paper's problems stemmed partly from internal strife which led to McDowells's daughter, Karen Erwin, not being made chief executive. The reorganisation had the desired effect; after posting losses of almost €3 million in 2002, the paper returned to profit in 2003.

John Waters, a columnist who spoke out about the perceived vast salaries of the editor, managing director and deputy editor, was sacked and re-hired a week later, in November 2003. Former editor Geraldine Kennedy was paid more than the editor of the UK's top non-tabloid newspaper The Daily Telegraph, which has a circulation of about nine times that of The Irish Times. Later, columnist Fintan O'Toole told the Sunday Independent: "We as a paper are not shy of preaching about corporate pay and fat cats but with this there is a sense of excess. Some of the sums mentioned are disturbing. This is not an attack on Ms Kennedy, it is an attack on the executive level of pay. There is double-standard of seeking more job cuts while paying these vast salaries.

On 23 December 2004, The Irish Times ran a front-page story on the Provisional IRA's denial of involvement in the Northern Bank robbery, one of Europe's largest ever, and on the same day refused to print a column by Kevin Myers which said that the Provisional IRA was responsible. Myers was reported to be shocked by the spiking of his column. Some two weeks later, the paper printed a report that there might, after all, be a "nationalist" connection. Myers later left the paper.

The following May, the paper launched a new international edition, which was available in London and southeast England at the same time as other daily newspapers (previously, copies of the Irish edition were flown from Dublin to major cities in Britain on passenger flights, arriving around lunchtime). It was printed at the Newsfax plant in Hackney, and uses the Financial Times distribution network.

The Irish Times tended to support the Lisbon Treaty. However, opposing views were also printed, including articles by Declan Ganley of Libertas Ireland, and other anti-Lisbon campaigners.

The Central Bank of Ireland fined The Irish Times in 2008 after it admitted breaking market abuse rules.

In 2009, the Supreme Court ordered the paper to pay €600,000 in costs despite winning its case about the importance of protecting journalistic sources, and called its destruction of evidence "reprehensible conduct".

The newspaper has been criticized for its perceived support of the British Army. An article in The Phoenix magazine examined an article in The Irish Times published in August 2010 on Irish nationals serving in the British Army. According to The Phoenix, the article romanticized the war in Afghanistan and was little more than a recruitment advertisement for the British Army. The magazine accused the editor Geraldine Kennedy and the Irish Times board of violating the Defence Act which prohibits any kind of advertising for recruitment for a foreign army and article 15.6.1 of the Constitution of Ireland which states "The right to raise and maintain military or armed forces is vested exclusively in the Oireachtas".

On 9 September 2011, the paper published a pseudonymous article by Kate Fitzgerald. Unknown to the paper, she had taken her life on 22 August 2011. The revelation sparked a nationwide debate on suicide with her parents appearing on television to discuss suicide and depression. The article criticised the reaction to her illness by her employer, The Communications Clinic, although it was only after she was identified as the author that her employer became known. The article was later removed from the paper's website, causing controversy online. The editor later told her parents that sections of her article were factually incorrect, but could not say which ones. Kate's parents complained to the Office of the Press Ombudsman about an apology made to The Communications Clinic, their complaint was upheld.

In September 2019, the paper reprinted an article from the New York Times by William Broad. The article claimed that "the blossoming anxiety over professed health risks of 5G [fifth generation wireless technology] 'can be traced to a single scientist and a single chart'". A complaint to the Office of the Press Ombudsman of the Press Council of Ireland was filed by Professor Tom Butler of the University College Cork. The Press Council Ombudsman upheld Butler's complaint, ruling that "The Irish Times breached Principle 1 (Truth and Accuracy) of the Code of Practice of the Press Council of Ireland".

Diversification
The company has diversified from its original Irish Times title as a source of revenue. Irish Times Limited has taken a majority share for €5m in the Gazette Group Newspapers, a group publishing three local newspapers in West Dublin, and has acquired a property website, MyHome.ie, the second-largest property internet website in Ireland, for €50m, seen as insurance against the loss of revenue from traditional classified property advertising. In June 2009, journalists called on the board and trust to review "the flawed investment and diversification strategy of the company" and passed a motion saying that "ongoing investment in loss-making projects poses a serious threat to employment" at the newspaper. Four months later, the company announced a loss of €37 million and that 90 staff would be made redundant. The director, Maeve Donovan, who instigated the "investment and diversification" strategy, subsequently retired. She dismissed suggestions that she would receive a significant "golden handshake", saying that her package would be "nothing out of the ordinary at all". She was given a €1m "ex-gratia" payment by the newspaper "relating to a commutation of pension rights agreed with her".

The managing director said in 2009 that mobile phone applications would be a key investment for newspapers and The Irish Times now has an application for the iPhone and Android smartphones.

In June 2010, Gazette group newspapers' managing director claimed the company's affairs were being conducted oppressively by its majority shareholder, the Irish Times.

Offices

In 1895, the paper moved from its original offices on Middle Abbey Street to D'Olier Street in the centre of Dublin. "D'Olier Street" became a metonym of The Irish Times which in turn was personified as "The Old Lady of D'Olier Street". In October 2006, the paper relocated to a new building on nearby Tara Street.

Online
In 1994, The Irish Times established a website called Irish-times.ie; it was the first newspaper in Ireland  and one of the first 30 newspapers in the world to do so. The company acquired the domain name Ireland.com in 1997, and from 1999 to 2008, used it to publish its online edition. It was freely available at first but charges and a registration fee were introduced in 2002 for access to most of the content. A number of blogs were added in April 2007 written by Jim Carroll, Shane Hegarty, and Conor Pope. On 30 June 2008, the company relaunched Ireland.com as a separate lifestyle portal and the online edition of the newspaper was now published at irishtimes.com. It was supplied free of charge, but a subscription was charged to view its archives.

On 15 October 2012 John O'Shea, Head of Online, The Irish Times, announced that the ireland.com domain name had been sold to Tourism Ireland, and that the ireland.com email service would end on 7 November 2012. The domain name was sold for €495,000. The ending of the email service affected about 15,000 subscribers.

The newspaper announced on 17 February 2015 the reintroduction of a paywall for its website, irishtimes.com, beginning on 23 February.

Format and content

The paper has the same standard layout every day. The front page contains one main picture and three main news stories, with the left-hand column, News Digest, providing a "teaser" of some of the stories inside the Home News, World News, Sport and Business Today sections as well as other information such as winning lottery numbers and weather forecasts.  Inside, it usually contains eight to twelve pages of Irish news, called "Home News", covering the Republic of Ireland and Northern Ireland. It devotes several pages to important stories such as the publication of government reports, government budgets, important courts cases, and so on.

World News contains news from its correspondents abroad and from news wires and services such as Reuters, the Guardian Service, and the Los Angeles Times-Washington Post service. The paper has correspondents in London, Paris, Brussels, and Washington.

The Irish Times publishes its residential property supplement every Thursday, one of the printed residential property listings for the Dublin area. This is also online. Motoring and employment supplements are published on Wednesday and Friday respectively, and are also online.

A business supplement is published every Friday, as is an entertainment supplement called The Ticket, with film, music, theatre reviews, interviews, articles, and media listings. It features cinema writer Donald Clarke and music writers Jim Carroll, Brian Boyd, Tony Clayton-Lea and others. Michael Dwyer, the distinguished film critic and recipient of the Chevalier des Arts et des Lettres, wrote for the supplement until his death in 2010.

On Saturdays, a Weekend section is published, with news features, arts profiles, television and radio columns, and book reviews of mainly literary and biographical works, with occasional reviews in the technology sector. The Saturday edition also includes the Magazine with consumer and lifestyle features on food, wine, gardening, and there are travel and sports supplements.

Three Sudoku puzzles and two crosswords are published daily including a cryptic crossword, formerly compiled by "Crosaire", and a "Simplex" crossword. There is also a letters page.
J.J. Walsh has contributed a chess puzzle to the paper since April 1955, originally weekly the puzzle became a daily fixture in September 1972.

The paper carries political cartoons by Martyn Turner and the American cartoon strip, Doonesbury. The business section has a satirical illustration by David Rooney every Friday. Tom Mathews contributes an arts-inspired cartoon (called "Artoon") to the arts section on Saturday.

A weekly Irish language page is carried on Wednesdays.

Purchase of Irish Examiner and other assets
In December 2017, it was reported that The Irish Times had reached an agreement to purchase the newspaper, radio and website interests of Landmark Media Investments which include the Irish Examiner. Initially subject to regulatory approval, the sale was completed in July 2018.

2018 redundancies
In September 2018, The Irish Times started a voluntary redundancy scheme. This followed the Landmark Media Investments acquisition.

Print circulation
Average print circulation was approximately 100,000 copies per issue in 2011, dropping to approximately 62,000 by 2017. The circulation of the newspaper is no longer audited.

Digital Irish Times circulation
ABC measure digital circulation based on paid for digital subscriptions that include an ePaper in the package. This means that the free student edition and the basic package, which does not include an ePaper, are excluded from the below statistics.

Newspapers owned by The Irish Times DAC
 The Irish Times
 Irish Examiner (acquired from Landmark Media Investments)
 The Echo  (acquired from Landmark Media Investments)
 Roscommon Herald (acquired from Landmark Media Investments)
 Western People  (acquired from Landmark Media Investments)
 Waterford News & Star (acquired from Landmark Media Investments)
 The Nationalist (Carlow) (acquired from Landmark Media Investments)
 Kildare Nationalist (acquired from Landmark Media Investments)
 Laois Nationalist (acquired from Landmark Media Investments)

The Irish Times DAC investments ownership

Magazine
 Gloss Magazine (50% stake via Gloss Publications )

Radio
 Beat 102-103 (acquired from Landmark Media Investments)
 WLR FM (acquired from Landmark Media Investments) 
 Red FM (17% ownership) (acquired from Landmark Media Investments)

Digital
 RecruitIreland.com (acquired from Landmark Media Investments)
 BreakingNews.ie (acquired from Landmark Media Investments)
 BenchWarmers.ie (acquired from Landmark Media Investments) (Sold to Rocket Sports Internet)
 Myhome.ie (acquired from Sherry FitzGerald, the Gunne Group and Douglas Newman Good)

Other assets
 Itronics (training company)
 DigitalworX (Web publisher)

Columns
Regular columns include:
 An Irishman's Diary
 Another Life is a weekly natural history column written and illustrated since 1977 by Michael Viney.
 Rite and Reason is a weekly religious column. It is edited by the religious editor, Patsy McGarry. Many prominent Roman Catholic and Church of Ireland bishops, Irish Jewish leaders, theologians from all faiths, and journalists, among others, have written the column which is published on the op-ed page on Mondays.
 Social and Personal

Editors
 Dr. George Ferdinand Shaw (1859)
 Rev. George Bomford Wheeler (1859–1877)
 James Scott (1877–1899)
 William Algernon Locker (1901–1907)
 John Edward Healy (1907–1934)
 Robert Maire "Bertie" Smyllie (1934–1954)
 Alec Newman (1954–61)
 Alan Montgomery (1961–1963)
 Douglas Gageby (1963–1974 and 1977–1986)
 Fergus Pyle (1974–1977)
 Conor Brady (1986–2002)
 Geraldine Kennedy (2002–2011)
 Kevin O'Sullivan (2011–2017)
 Paul O'Neill (2017–2022)
15. Ruadhan Mac Cormaic (2022-present)

Past and present contributors

 Charles Acton
 John Banville
 Brendan Behan
 Maeve Binchy
 Vincent Browne
 Tom Clonan
 Myles na gCopaleen
 Cónal Creedon
 Garret FitzGerald
 Theodora FitzGibbon
 Donal Foley
 Elgy Gillespie
 John Healy
 Mary Holland
 Róisín Ingle
 Dennis Kennedy
 Karlin Lillington
 Liam MacGabhann
 Emer McLysaght
 Lara Marlowe
 Seamus Martin
 Kevin Myers
 Breda O'Brien
 Conor O'Clery
 Aidan O'Sullivan
 Fintan O'Toole
 Fergus Pyle
 Arthur Quinlan
 Martyn Turner
 John Waters
 Noel Whelan
 Terence de Vere White
 Thomas Woods
 Maev-Ann Wren
 Newton Emerson

See also
 List of newspapers in Ireland
 Irish Times National Debating Championship
 List of Irish companies
 The Times (United Kingdom)
 The New York Times (United States)

References

External links

 

 
1859 establishments in Ireland
Times
Irish news websites
Newspaper companies of Ireland
Newspapers published in the Republic of Ireland
Newspapers established in 1859